Taronga Zoo is a zoo located in Sydney, New South Wales, Australia, in the suburb of Mosman, on the shores of Sydney Harbour. The opening hours are between 9:30 a.m. to 5 p.m. Taronga is an Aboriginal word meaning "beautiful view".

It was officially opened on 7 October 1916. Taronga Zoo Sydney is managed by the Zoological Parks Board of New South Wales, under the trading name Taronga Conservation Society, along with its sister zoo, the Taronga Western Plains Zoo in Dubbo.

Divided into various zoogeographic regions, the  Taronga Zoo Sydney is home to more than 2,600 animals of approximately 250 different species. It has a zoo shop, a cafe, and an information centre.

History

The Royal Zoological Society of New South Wales opened the first public zoo in New South Wales in 1884 at Billy Goat Swamp in Moore Park, on a site now occupied by Sydney Boys High School and Sydney Girls High School. Inspired by a 1908 visit to the Hamburg Zoo, the secretary of the zoo, Albert Sherbourne Le Souef, envisioned a new zoo based on the bar-less concept. After realising that the Moore Park site was too small, the NSW Government granted  of land north of Sydney Harbour. A further  were later granted in 1916, and the zoo at its current site opened to the public on the 7th October 1916.

Rustic Bridge
The "Rustic Bridge" was opened in 1915 and was one of Taronga Zoo's earliest landscape features. It was the main way in which visitors could cross the natural gully that it spans. Early photographs show it as a romantic pathway secluded by plantings. The rustic effect was created by embedding stones in the wall and like the aquarium, its design was reminiscent of Italian grottoes.

Late 20th century
A critical review in 1967 led to a new emphasis on scientific conservation, education and preservation. New exhibits were built starting with the Platypus and Nocturnal houses, waterfowl ponds and walkthrough Rainforest Aviary. A Veterinary Quarantine Centre was built as was an Education Centre (funded by the Department of Education). Previous attractions such as elephant rides, miniature trains, monkey circus and merry-go-round gave way to educational facilities such as Friendship Farm and Seal Theatre (these latter two exhibits completed in the late 1970s).

A gondola lift was installed in 1987 and updated in 2000, running from the bottom of the park close to the ferry wharf, and transported passengers to the top end of the zoo. The gondola closed on 31 January 2023 and, if approved, will re-open in 2025.

2000 master plan
In 2000, TCSA commenced a 12-year $250 million master plan, the majority of which is being spent at Taronga Zoo. The first major master plan item was the Backyard to Bush precinct which opened in April 2003. Under the plan, the zoo received five Asian elephants from the Thailand Zoological Park Organisation for breeding purposes, education, long-term research and involvement of conservation programs. The plan has met opposition from environmental activists in Thailand, who blockaded the trucks hauling the elephants to Bangkok International Airport for their flight on 5 June 2006. The elephants along with other Asian rain forest specimens are housed in the Wild Asia precinct which opened in July 2005 (the elephants arriving from quarantine in November 2006) and aims to immerse visitors in an Asian rain forest environment (though later renamed Rainforest Trail as included species from tropical Africa).

A marine section, Great Southern Oceans, opened in April 2008. Recently, the redevelopment and restoration of the historic entrance opened, further adding to the masterplan. The chimpanzee exhibit also underwent expansion work and re-opened as Chimpanzee Sanctuary allowing its residents more space and also to assist making it easier for the introduction of new individuals by splitting the areas of the exhibit when necessary.

The Tiger Trek precinct opened in August 2017 allowing for multiple exhibits of critically endangered Sumatran tigers.

The zoo's African Savannah precinct, which opened in June 2020, was constructed as a major renovation and spatial expansion of the zoos' previous giraffe and zebra yards.

Zoo Friends
Zoo Friends offers support in form of volunteers and fund raising for both Taronga and Western Plains Zoo. Members are offered behind-the-scenes experiences at the zoo and unlimited zoo entry. Members are also eligible to volunteer to help at the zoo.

Notable events

Platypus birth
In February 2003, it became the second zoo in Australia to breed the platypus.

Australia's first elephant births
At 3.04 am on 4 July 2009, Thong Dee, an Asian elephant, gave birth to a male calf named Luk Chai. He is the first calf born in Australia. Thong Dee, and his father Gung, were two of the eight elephants imported into Australia to participate in the Australasian Conservation Breeding Program.

The baby elephant was a major tourist attraction, with thousands of visitors attending the zoo just to see him.

A second baby Asian elephant was thought to have died during labour on 8 March 2010. The calf's 18-year-old mother Porntip was in and out of labour over the week beforehand, after a pregnancy lasting almost two years.

Zoo keepers and veterinarians were concerned about the progress of the labour, with Porntip showing unusual movements and behaviour. An ultrasound revealed that the calf was unconscious in the birth canal, and the zoo announced on 8 March 2010 that the calf was believed to be dead. On 10 March 2010 at 3:27 am, the live male calf was born. He was subsequently named Pathi Harn, a Thai expression meaning "miracle". Pathi Harn's father is Bong Su, of the Melbourne Zoo, and was artificially conceived.

In October 2012, Pathi Harn critically injured his keeper by crushing her against a pole; the keeper survived.

Royal tour
On 20 April 2014, Prince William and Catherine, Duchess of Cambridge (as they were), along with their 8-month-old son, Prince George, visited Taronga Zoo Sydney to participate in an unveiling ceremony at the bilby exhibit. The bilby was eventually renamed "Bilby George" in honour of the little prince who performed his first official duty. Later, William and Kate visited the zoo again without George meeting the other animals for Easter.

Birth of Sumatran tiger cubs 
On 17 January 2019, Kartika, one of the zoo's four Sumatran tigers, gave birth to three cubs. Sumatran tigers are critically endangered, with fewer than 350 individuals alive in the wild. In total, 21 tiger cubs have been born at Taronga since 1980.

Ongoing conservation work news
Taronga has been involved in numerous conservation captive breeding programs for endangered and vulnerable species for more than fifty years when the zoos management changed Taronga's trajectory away from general visitor entertainment to focus on assisting species that are threatened in their wild habitats.

For example, in November 2021 Taronga released 58 captive bred critically endangered regent honeyeaters into the wild.

The zoo's female pygmy hippopotamus Kambiri gave birth to a female calf named Amara on 22 November 2021, who died suddenly on 24 December.

World's only leopard seals in a zoo
Taronga Zoo was once home to the world's only leopard seals living in a zoo. Leopard seals are native to Antarctica but on rare occasions, will come up to Australia's coastlines during the late winter months. From 1999 - 2014 Taronga housed three different leopard seals, Brooke, Sabine (females) and Casey (male). All three were found separately washed up on beaches sick, malnourished or injured. As leopard seals are from the Antarctic, it was recommended that these seals not be returned to the wild once rehabilitated as they could potentially transfer unknown diseases to the fragile wild population and cause damage to the Antarctic ecosystem.

These three contributed to important research conducted by the Australian Marine Mammal Research Centre (AMMRC), bettering the understanding of this typically remote and lesser understood species. AMMRC conducted important scientific studies using these three as subjects, including leopard seal whisker growth rate, echolocation inaudible to the human ear and the suction and filter feeding that leopard seals use to hunt krill in the Antarctic. 

An entire new enclosure was built to house the leopard seals, located in the new Great Southern Ocean Exhibit which opened to the public in 2008. This exhibit now houses Australian sea lions, Australian fur seals, Californian sea lions and New Zealand fur seals.

Brooke was the first to be rescued. In 1999 Brooke was found on Garie Beach in the Royal National Park. She was underweight, dehydrated and suffering from shark attack injuries. She was taken to Taronga Zoo for rehabilitation, keepers and veterinarians at Taronga were able to nurse Brooke back to health. She was unable to be released after this due to concerns that she harboured unknown diseases. Brooke was very popular with staff and visitors, being the first of her kind on display in the world. In 2008 Brooke suddenly became less active and started refusing food and it was believed that she was succumbing to an unknown infection; on 23 May 2008 she succumbed to her illness and died. It is not known exactly how old Brooke was as she was not born at the zoo, but she was believed to be around 10 years old at her death.

Sabine was the second leopard seal to come into Taronga's care, being found on Clontarf Beach in 2007, malnourished and on the brink of death with cookiecutter shark injuries. Sabine was nursed back to health by Taronga's keepers. The exact date of Sabine's death is unknown.

Taronga's final leopard seal Casey was found in 2007 a week after Sabine was found. Casey was found washed ashore at Wattamolla, south of Sydney in poor health with a recent cookiecutter shark wound on his abdomen. Like the other two leopard seals, Casey was also unable to be released back to the Antarctic and was kept at Taronga as a permanent resident. Casey was nursed back to health; once the Great Southern Ocean exhibit opened in 2008 he and Sabine were moved there together, with Brooke dying months before it opened. Taronga Zoo hoped to encourage Casey and Sabine to mate, having the first leopard seal pup born in a zoo, but Casey was so young when he was found stranded that he never learnt his mating call. Taronga played the mating calls of mature male leopard seals for Casey in hopes that he would learn them, but Sabine died before he could learn them. In 2014 Casey's health and condition began to decline. Despite Taronga marine mammal and veterinary teams' efforts to help him Casey showed no signs of recovery. On 20 February 2014 the decision was made to euthanize him.

Exhibits and wildlife collection
Taronga Zoo Sydney cares for approximately 2,000 animals from over 150 different species, many of which are threatened. They are housed in a large variety of exhibits, including:

Wild Australia

                                                                                                                                                                                               
Koala Walkabout
 Koala

Platypus Pool
 Platypus

Nura Diya Australia
 Dingo
 Southern cassowary

Tasmanian Devil Conservation Centre
 Eastern long-beaked echidna
 Tasmanian devil

Backyard to Bush

(House)
 Black house spider
 Children's python
 Golden huntsman spider
 Goliath stick insect
 Grey huntsman spider
 Redback spider
 Spiny leaf insect

(Backyard)
 Budgerigar
 Domestic rabbit
 King quail
 Red-bellied black snake

(Farmyard)
 Alpaca
 Chicken
 Coastal carpet python
 Communal huntsman spider
 Cunningham's spiny-tailed skink
 Daddy long-legs spider
 Domestic duck
 European honey bee
 Goat
 Guinea pig
 House mouse
 Violet-winged stick insect
(Bush)
 Emu
 Flinders Range scorpion
 Giant burrowing cockroach
 Queensland whistling tarantula
 Quokka
 Red kangaroo
 Red-necked wallaby
 Short-beaked echidna
 Southern hairy-nosed wombat
 Spinifex hopping-mouse
 Sydney funnel-web spider

Blue Mountains Bushwalk

 Australian zebra finch
 Brown cuckoo dove
 Brush bronzewing
 Brush-tailed rock wallaby
 Budgerigar
 Chestnut-breasted mannikin
 Common bronzewing
 Cunningham's spiny-tailed skink
 Crested bellbird
 Crested pigeon
 Dollarbird
 Eastern whipbird
 Gang-gang cockatoo
 Glossy black cockatoo
 Grey-crowned babbler
 Little lorikeet
 Masked lapwing
 Noisy pitta
 Pacific emerald dove
 Peaceful dove
 Plumed whistling duck
 Red-rumped parrot
 Regent bowerbird
 Regent honeyeater
 Rose-crowned fruit dove
 Sacred kingfisher
 Scaly-breasted lorikeet
 Southern leaf-tailed gecko
 Striped honeyeater
 Superb lyrebird
 Superb parrot
 Wandering whistling duck
 White-browed woodswallow
 Wonga pigeon

Australian Rainforest Aviary
 Australian golden whistler
 Australian king parrot
 Black-faced monarch
 Blue-faced parrot-finch
 Brown cuckoo dove
 Crimson finch
 Double-eyed fig-parrot
 Eclectus parrot
 Forest kingfisher
 Golden whistler
 Gouldian finch
 Little lorikeet
 Metallic starling
 Musk lorikeet
 Noisy pitta
 Pacific emerald dove
 Regent bowerbird
 Rose-crowned fruit dove
 Superb fruit dove
 Topknot pigeon
 Variegated fairywren
 White-headed pigeon

(Other) Australian Birds
 Crimson finch
 Green pygmy-goose
 Masked finch
 Rufous whistler
 Spinifex pigeon

Great Southern Oceans

 Australian pelican
 Australian sea lion
 California sea lion
 Fiordland penguin
 Little penguin
 New Zealand fur seal

Serpentarium

 Australian scrub python
 Bellinger River snapping turtle
 Black-headed python
 Boa constrictor
 Booroolong frog
 Boyd's forest dragon
 Broad-headed snake
 Central netted dragon
 Coastal taipan
 Corn snake
 Eastern blue-tongued lizard
 Eastern diamondback rattlesnake
 Eastern dwarf tree frog
 Eastern long-neck turtle
 Eastern Pilbara spiny-tailed skink
 Elongated tortoise
 Eyelash viper
 Fiji crested iguana
 Freshwater crocodile
 Frilled lizard
 Giant cave gecko
 Gila monster
 Golden-tailed gecko
 Goldfield's crevice-skink
 Green anaconda
 Green tree python
 Hosmer's spiny-tailed skink
 Indian star tortoise
 Inland pygmy python
 Land mullet
 Monocled cobra
 Murray River turtle
 Northern corroboree frog
 Olive python
 Plumed basilisk
 Red-barred dragon
 Red-bellied black snake
 Red-eyed tree frog
 Reticulated python
 Rhinoceros iguana
 River cooter
 Rusty desert monitor
 Sheltopusik
 Southern corroboree frog
 Stimson's python
 Tuatara
 White-lipped tree frog
 Yellow spotted bell frog

African Savannah

 African lion
 Fennec fox
 Giraffe
 Helmeted guineafowl (free roaming)
 Meerkat
 Plains zebra

Chimpanzee Sanctuary
 Chimpanzee

Rainforest Trail

 Asian elephant
 Asian small-clawed otter
 Binturong
 Eastern bongo
 Egyptian goose
 Fishing cat
 François' langur
 Northern white-cheeked gibbon
 Pygmy hippopotamus
 Ruddy shelduck
 Sun bear
 Western lowland gorilla
(Palm Aviary)
 Black-headed munia
 Double-eyed fig parrot
 Forest kingfisher
 Golden pheasant
 King quail
 Luzon bleeding-heart
 Metallic starling
 Nicobar pigeon
 Noisy pitta
 Red-whiskered bulbul
 Regent bowerbird
 Superb fruit dove
 Torresian imperial pigeon
 White-breasted ground dove
 White-rumped shama
 Wompoo fruit-dove
(Wetland Aviary)
 Australian reed-warbler
 Eastern whipbird
 Glossy ibis
 Java sparrow
 Koi
 Lady Amherst's pheasant
 Little pied cormorant
 Pied heron
 Red lory
 Red-lored amazon
 Royal spoonbill
 Wandering whistling duck

Tiger Trek
 Sumatran tiger

Primate Islands 
 Bolivian squirrel monkey
 Cotton-top tamarin

Other species on main display
 Aldabra giant tortoise
 Andean condor
 Capybara
 Dromedary camel
 Goodfellow's tree-kangaroo
 Indian peafowl (free roaming)
 Red panda
 Ring-tailed lemur

Upcoming 

 Nura Diya Australia (complete opening April 2023)
 Australian Nocturnal House (reopening April 2023)
 New reptile and amphibian building
 Tropical Africa precinct with okapi
 New wildlife hospital

Chimpanzee community 

Taronga Zoo is currently home to a multi-male, multi-female troop of 21 chimpanzees of various ages.

Males 

Samaki was born in November 2001 to Shiba. He is the alpha male of the group since 2021 with Sule acting as his right-hand chimp'. Samaki and his brother Shabani were known for years by keepers as the "S boys" when Samaki acted as a supporter for older brother Shabani during various alpha challenges against previous alpha Lubutu. Samaki has now successfully taken the alpha role for himself with support in particular from Sule. Samaki is the father of Cebele.

Shabani was born in September 1994 to Shiba. Shabani is not very tolerant of the infants in the group and will occasionally redirect aggression towards the females of the group.  Shabani had attempted many times to oust previous alpha male Lubutu from his position, but his lack of popularity meant the females supported Lubutu during any conflicts, now his younger brother Samaki has taken the alpha male role.

Furahi was born in February 2003 to Kuma.  He is one of two adolescent males in the troop and has a close relationship with his mother, Kuma.  Furahi had offered support to his mother, particularly when his baby brother Fumo was born in 2013. Furahi enjoys displaying, like the adult males in the troop and will occasionally harass the females.

Shikamoo was born in July 2003 to Sasha.  Shikamoo has a close friendship with Furahi and is often seen bonding with him.  Shikamoo is protective of his brother, Sule, and is popular amongst the females of the troop, particularly Kuma and Kamili.  Shikamoo is the father of Fumo.

Sule was born in April 2008 to Sasha.  Sule was the youngest member of the troop for five years until the birth of Fumo. Sule had often babysitting Fumo when he was smaller. He has likely learnt this behaviour from his elder brother, Shikamoo, who used to interact with Sule in a similar way. Sule has shown advanced social skills from a young age and often acts as a peacemaker during altercations.  He is popular amongst the troop and enjoys showing off to the visitors. He occasionally has tantrums and flicks his hands in the air.

Fumo was born in October 2013 to Kuma. He is the oldest of the four infants in the community.  Kuma has encouraged Fumo's development from an early age and he is advanced in his climbing skills. Fumo had recently begun using the artificial termite mound at a very early age. Fumo has created a good relationship with the youngest infant, Cebele.

Sudi was born in August 2014 to Shiba. Sudi has been kept under close protection from his mother, and has not been allowed the freedom to explore, Kuma has allowed Fumo.

Liwali was born in September 2014 to Lisa.  Liwali was the youngest chimpanzee in the group for three years until Cebele was born in 2017. Liwali has developed a close bond with the other two infants, Fumo and Sudi, as they have grown up together.

Niambi was born in October 2020 to Naomi. He is the currently the youngest chimpanzee in the community.

Females 

Spitter was born at Taronga Zoo Sydney in June 1960 to Biddy and is the most senior female in the community.  Spitter has had seven offspring including an unnamed son who was born and died in January 1972, an unnamed son who was born and died in July 1973, a daughter Speedy who was born in May 1975 and died in July 1975, a daughter Sheba who was born in June 1978 and died in September 1978, a daughter Sacha who was born in June 1980, a daughter Sally who was born in January 1985 and a son Gombe who was born in December 1988 and died in May 2001.  Sally was exported to Wellington Zoo in April 1992.  Spitter is now post reproductive.

Koko was born in January 1972 in the wild, and came to Taronga Zoo Sydney in February 1993.  She had five offspring including an unnamed daughter who was born and died in August 1994, a daughter Kamili who was born in September 1995, an unnamed daughter who was born and died in June 1999, an unnamed daughter who was born and died in February 2003 and an unnamed son who was born and died in September 2014.

Lisa was born at Taronga Zoo in August 1979 to Lulu and is the highest ranking female. Lisa has had four offspring including a son Lobo who was born in June 1989 and died in November 1996, a son Lubutu who was born in June 1993, a daughter Lani who was born in May 2002 and a son Liwali who was born in September 2014. Lani has since moved zoos.

Sasha was born at Taronga Zoo in June 1980 to Spitter. Sacha has had six offspring including a son Sokwe who was born in August 1989 and died in October 1989, a daughter Kike who was born in April 1991, a son Sandali who was born in February 1996, an unnamed daughter who was born and died in September 2002, a son Shikamoo was born in July 2003 and a son Sule who was born in April 2008.  Kike was exported to Perth Zoo in June 1998 and Sandali was exported to Adelaide Zoo in December 2008.

Shiba was born in May 1981 to Susie and has produced five offspring.  A son, Shabani in 1994, an unnamed male who died at birth in 1999, a son, Samaki in 2001, a daughter Sembe, in 2008 and a son, Sudi in 2014.  Shiba is a high ranking female in the troop and is independent and tough.  Her mother, Susie, died in 1995, leaving Shiba without the maternal support Lisa and Sasha had from their mothers.  Today, Shiba has support in conflicts from her two adult sons, Shabani and Samaki.  She did not initially accept Lubutu's take over as alpha male in 2001 as he was only eight years old, and she likely realised his threat to her son Shabani's chances of becoming the alpha male.  Shiba is fiercely protective of her offspring and access to her newborn son, Sudi, by the troop was very restricted while he was small.

Shona was born in October 1987 and is the lowest ranking adult. Shona was sterilised during the 1990s and has never produced any offspring.  Shona has a good relationship with the alpha male, Lubutu, but receive little support from the other chimpanzee, including her aunt, Shiba.  Shona is a small chimpanzee and is often harassed by the males. Shona has a good relationship with Kamili.

Kuma was born in December 1991 to Ficha and has given birth to three offspring, a son Furahi who was born in February 2003, an unnamed daughter who was born and died in October 2012 and a son Fumo who was born in October 2013.  Kuma, then an adolescent, had a difficult time raising her first son, Furahi, due to a lack of family support.  Furahi, now fully grown, and supported Kuma in raising her second son, Fumo.  Kuma has made significant advances in the hierarchy. This success is due to her large size, the support of an adult son, and her ferocity.  It is not uncommon to see Kuma take on the alpha or beta male and win, especially if she is defending Furahi in conflicts.

Kamili was born in September 1995 to Koko, and has had three offspring.  Her first offspring, was an unnamed daughter, born in 2005, who died in 2005. Kamili gave birth again in 2013, to an unnamed son, which died after birth. Kamili gave birth to her third offspring in 2014, which died shortly after birth due to mismothering. Kamili had been separated, along with her pregnant mother, Koko, to allow the two low ranked females to raise their young in safety during the critical first weeks, but this was unsuccessful.  Koko, and Kamili are often involved with conflicts within the group and receive little support from the others. In 2004, Koko and Kamili attacked Shiba's juvenile son, Samaki, who probably would have been killed, had Shiba not intervened. Kamili is close to Shona and the pair often spend time grooming each other.

Sembe was born in February 2008 to Shiba.  Sembe has always been very close to her mother, Shiba, and had struggled to adjust to the birth of her new sibling, Sudi.  Sembe was still riding on her mother's back at the age of six but as Shiba's pregnancy advanced, she grew less tolerant of this.  Sembe often walked, one arm draped over her mother.  Sembe is a feisty young female who had struggled to adjust to life within the community when her mother was fully absorbed with Sudi.  Sembe lacks the social skills displayed by Sule and will have to work hard if she is to make any connections outside of her family.  She remains close to her adult brothers, Shabani and Samaki and often interacts with Sule, who is two months younger.  For many years, Sembe was dominant to Sule, but as they entered adolescence, the roles quickly began to reverse.

Naomi was born at Givskud zoo in Denmark. She has adjusted well to her move, however she is often involved in fights with members within her group.

Ceres was born at Givskud zoo in Denmark. She has had one offspring. A daughter on 14 November 2017 named Cebele. Ceres is very protective of Cebele and always makes sure that she knows of her whereabouts. Cebele can't get very far. Ceres is quite selective when it comes to who she lets play with Cebele.

Cebele was born at Taronga Zoo Sydney on 14 November 2017. She is the youngest member of the group. Cebele is still clinging to her mothers stomach and is often seen cuddling with Fumo and her mother.

Safiri was born to Shiba in May 2019.

Lubutu (1993–2019)

Lubutu (5 June 1993 – 4 December 2019) was born to Lisa and was the long term alpha male of the chimpanzee troop at Taronga Zoo up until his sudden death from lung failure. Lubutu took on the role of alpha male at the age of nine years after the previous alpha male, Snowy (his father) died suddenly. Lubutu was tolerant of the infants in the group and was often seen playing with them. Through his fair leadership and support from the females in the troop, Lubutu attributed to his success and lengthy tenure as a leader. At one point during Lubutu's leadership, Samaki and Shabani stood an excellent chance of taking over the alpha role. Lubutu was the father of Samaki, Furahi, Shikamoo, Sembe and Sule. He was vasectomised in 2009 as his genetics are now well represented in the region. (Due to his significant role in the troop, he is still acknowledged here despite having died).

Transport

The Taronga Zoo ferry services are, for many tourists, the preferred mode of travel to the zoo, providing a 12-minute ride from the city to the zoo. Passengers disembarking at the ferry wharf, located on Bradleys Head Road, can enter the zoo via a gondola lift or connect with local Keolis Downer Northern Beaches bus services. Sydney Ferries offers combined "ZooLink" tickets covering ferry fares, park entry, and gondola ride.

Taronga Zoo Sydney also works heavily with various other Sydney Harbour transport operators, such as Captain Cook Cruises and Yellow Water Taxis. Both of these operators offer combined tickets/packages which include tickets covering transport fares, park entry, and gondola ride.

Conservation 
Taronga Zoo engages in a number of conservation efforts aimed at minimising human impact and ensuring ecological sustainability, working both in Australia and internationally. In 2016, the legacy commitment was launched, focused on the conservation of ten critical species. These species included five native to Australia, namely the regent honeyeater, southern corroboree frog, sea turtles, platypus, and greater bilby, as well as five from Sumatra; the Sumatran rhinoceros, Sumatran tiger, Asian elephant, sun bear, and Sunda pangolin.

The zoo also focuses on minimising waste, diverting 84% of waste away from landfill and towards 20 different recycling streams. One main focus is on single use plastics, encouraging reusable bags, water bottles, and coffee cups on site, and distributing biodegradable bags and food packaging. As part of the Seal talk and demonstration, the zoo encourages sustainable seafood choice through the MSC label.

Incidents

2022 lion escape 
On the morning of 2 November 2022 at 6.40am, five African lions escaped their enclosure. Police officers were called to the zoo at around 7.00am, and no injuries were reported. The lions were returned to their enclosure with one cub tranquilized. On 1 December 2022, the ABC published CCTV footage, obtained in a Government Information Public Access request, that shows the lions escaping through a hole in a fence.

Gallery

See also

 Taronga Conservation Society
 Taronga Western Plains Zoo
 Taronga by Victor Kelleher, a work of fiction using Taronga Zoo as its setting

References

External links
 

1916 establishments in Australia
Zoos established in 1916
Zoos in New South Wales
Buildings and structures in Sydney
Parks in Sydney
Tourist attractions in Sydney
Mosman, New South Wales